Japan competed at the 1992 Summer Olympics in Barcelona, Spain. 256 competitors, 175 men and 81 women, took part in 166 events in 24 sports.

Medalists

| width=78% align=left valign=top |

| width=22% align=left valign=top |

Competitors
The following is the list of number of competitors in the Games.

Archery

In the nation's fifth Olympic archery competition, five of Japan's six archers failed to qualify for the elimination round.  The one that did, Hiroshi Yamamoto, lost his match.  Both teams lost their first matches in the team round as well.

Women's Individual Competition:
 Keiko Nakagomi — Ranking round, 47th place (0-0)
 Reiko Fujita — Ranking round, 48th place (0-0)
 Yukiko Ikeda — Ranking round, 49th place (0-0)

Men's Individual Competition:
 Hiroshi Yamamoto — Round of 32, 17th place (0-1)
 Naoto Oku — Ranking round, 47th place (0-0)
 Kiyokazu Nishikawa— Ranking round, 61st place (0-0)

Women's Team Competition:
 Nakagomi, Fujita, and Ikeda — Round of 16, 14th place (0-1)

Men's Team Competition:
 Yamamoto, Oku, and Nishikawa — Round of 16, 15th place (0-1)

Athletics

Men's 100 metres
Tatsuo Sugimoto
 Heat — 10.56 (→ did not advance)

Men's 10,000 metres
Haruo Urata
 Heat — 28:24.08
 Final — 28:37.61 (→ 14th place)

Sakae Osaki
 Heat — 29:20.01 (→ did not advance)

Men's 4 × 400 m Relay
Masayoshi Kan, Susumu Takano, Yoshihiko Saito, and Takahiro Watanabe   
 Heat — 3:01.35 (→ did not advance)

Men's Marathon
 Koichi Morishita — 2:13.45 (→  Silver Medal)
 Takeyuki Nakayama — 2:14.02 (→ 4th place)
 Hiromi Taniguchi — 2:14.42 (→ 8th place)

Men's 50 km Walk
Fumio Imamura — 4:07:45 (→ 18th place)
Takehiro Sonohara — 4:13:22 (→ 22nd place)
Tadahiro Kosaka — 4:14:24 (→ 24th place)

Men's 110m Hurdles
Toshihiko Iwasaki
 Quarterfinals — 13.88 (→ did not advance)

Men's 400m Hurdles
Kazuhiko Yamazaki
 Heat — 50.30 (→ did not advance)

Yoshihiko Saito
 Heat — 49.01 (→ did not advance)

Men's Javelin Throw
Masami Yoshida 
 Qualification — 72.88 m  (→ did not advance)

Men's Long Jump
Masaki Morinaga
 Qualification — 7.79 m (→ did not advance)

Men's Triple Jump
Norifumi Yamashita 
 Qualification — 15.97 m (→ did not advance)

Women's 10,000 metres
Izumi Maki
 Heat — 32:07.91
 Final — 31:55.06 (→ 12th place)

Miki Igarashi
 Heat — 32:45.47
 Final — 32:09.58 (→ 14th place)

Hiromi Suzuki
 Heat — 34:29.64 (→ did not advance)

Women's 10 km Walk
Miki Itakura
 Final — 47:11 (→ 23rd place)

Yuko Sato
 Final — 47:43 (→ 24th place)

Women's Marathon
 Yuko Arimori — 2:32.49 (→  Silver Medal)
 Sachiko Yamashita — 2:36.26 (→ 4th place)
 Yumi Kokamo — 2:58.18 (→ 29th place)

Women's High Jump
 Megumi Sato 
 Qualification — 1.92 m
 Final — 1.91 m (→ 7th place)

Badminton

Baseball

Japan was one of the eight teams to play in the first Olympic baseball tournament.  In the preliminary round, the Japanese team defeated the United States and four other teams, but lost to Cuba and Chinese Taipei to come in third place in the round after those two teams.  In the semifinal, Japan again played against Taipei, losing once more to be relegated to the bronze medal game.  There, they again faced the United States and repeated their victory to take home the medal.

Men's Team Competition:
 Japan →  Bronze Medal (6-3)
Team Roster
Tomohito Ito
Shinichiro Kawabata
Masahito Kohiyama
Hirotami Kojima
Hiroki Kokubo
Takashi Miwa
Hiroshi Nakamoto
Masafumi Nishi
Kazutaka Nishiyama
Koichi Oshima
Hiroyuki Sakaguchi
Shinichi Sato
Yasuhiro Sato
Masanori Sugiura
Kento Sugiyama
Yasunori Takami
Akihiro Togo
Koji Tokunaga
Shigeki Wakabayashi
Katsumi Watanabe

Boxing

Men's Light Flyweight (– 48 kg)
 Tadahiro Sasaki
 First Round — Defeated Domenic Figliomeni (CAN), 5:3 
 Second Round — Lost to Valentin Barbu (ROM), 7:10

Men's Lightweight (– 60 kg)
 Shigeyuki Dobashi
 First Round — Defeated Delroy Leslie (JAM), 11:5 
 Second Round — Lost to Julien Lorcy (FRA), RSC-2

Men's Welterweight (– 67 kg)
 Masashi Kawakami
 First Round — Lost to Adrian Dodson (GBR), RSC-3

Men's Light-Middleweight (– 71 kg)
 Hiroshi Nagashima
 First Round — Lost to Maselino Masoe (ASA), RSCI-3 (00:54)

Canoeing

Cycling

Twelve cyclists, nine men and three women, represented Japan in 1992.

Men's road race
 Tomokazu Fujino
 Kozo Fujita
 Mitsuteru Tanaka

Men's sprint
 Keiji Kojima

Men's 1 km time trial
 Keiji Kojima

Men's individual pursuit
 Masamitsu Ehara

Men's team pursuit
 Yasuhiro Ando
 Masamitsu Ehara
 Naokiyo Hashisako
 Makio Madarame

Men's points race
 Hiroshi Daimon

Women's road race
Yumiko Suzuki — 2:29:22 (→ 50th place)

Women's sprint
 Mika Kuroki

Women's individual pursuit
 Seiko Hashimoto

Diving

Men's 3m Springboard
Isao Yamagishi
 Preliminary Round — 344.40 points (→ did not advance, 21st place)

Keita Kaneto
 Preliminary Round — 295.74 points (→ did not advance, 31st place)

Men's 10m Platform
Keita Kaneto
 Preliminary Round — 391.05 points
Final — 529.14 points (→ 8th place)

Isao Yamagishi
 Preliminary Round — 331.23 (→ did not advance, 18th place)

Women's 3m Springboard
Yuki Motobuchi
Preliminary Round — 301.23 points 
Final — 443.76 points (→ 11th place)

Women's 10m Platform
Yuki Motobuchi
Preliminary Round — 239.01 points (→ did not advance, 26th place)

Equestrianism

Fencing

Six fencers, five men and one woman, represented Japan in 1992.

Men's foil
 Yoshihide Nagano
 Hiroki Ichigatani
 Kinya Abe

Men's épée
 Norikazu Tanabe

Men's sabre
 Hiroshi Hashimoto

Women's foil
 Yuko Takayanagi

Gymnastics

Judo

Modern pentathlon

One male pentathlete represented Japan in 1992.

Men's Individual Competition
 Hiroshi Miyagahara — 4859 points (→ 48th place)

Rhythmic gymnastics

Rowing

Sailing

Women's 470 Class
Yumiko Shige and Alicia Kinoshita
 Final Ranking — 53.7 points (→ 5th place)

Shooting

Swimming

Men's 50 m Freestyle
 Toshiaki Kurasawa
 Heat — 24.61 (→ did not advance, 47th place)

Men's 100 m Freestyle
 Tsutomu Nakano
 Heat — 51.63 (→ did not advance, 34th place)

 Shigeo Ogata
 Heat — 52.74 (→ did not advance, 45th place)

Men's 200 m Freestyle
 Shigeo Ogata
 Heat — 1:53.42 (→ did not advance, 30th place)

 Toshiaki Kurasawa
 Heat — 1:53.75 (→ did not advance, 31st place)

Men's 400 m Freestyle
 Shigeo Ogata
 Heat — 3:57.91 (→ did not advance, 24th place)

 Masashi Kato
 Heat — 4:00.66 (→ did not advance, 33rd place)

Men's 1500 m Freestyle
 Masashi Kato
 Heat — 15:40.94 (→ did not advance, 16th place)

Men's 100 m Backstroke
 Hajime Itoi
 Heat — 56.18
 B-Final — 56.64 (→ 12th place)

 Keita Soraoka
 Heat — 57.64 (→ did not advance, 27th place)

Men's 200 m Backstroke
 Hajime Itoi
 Heat — 1:59.95
 Final — 1:59.52 (→ 4th place)

 Keita Soraoka
 Heat — 2:03.10 (→ did not advance, 20th place)

Men's 100 m Breaststroke
 Akira Hayashi
 Heat — 1:01.76
 Final — 1:01.86 (→ 4th place)

 Kenji Watanabe
 Heat — 1:03.29 (→ did not advance, 18th place)

Men's 200 m Breaststroke
 Kenji Watanabe
 Heat — 2:14.35
 Final — 2:14.70 (→ 7th place)

 Akira Hayashi
 Heat — 2:14.61
 Final — 2:15.11 (→ 8th place)

Men's 100 m Butterfly
 Keiichi Kawanaka
 Heat — 55.18 (→ did not advance, 20th place)

 Tomohiro Miyoshi
 Heat — 55.98 (→ did not advance, 34th place)

Men's 200 m Butterfly
 Keiichi Kawanaka
 Heat — 1:59.96
 Final — 1:58.97 (→ 5th place)

 Tomohiro Miyoshi
 Heat — 2:01.27 (→ did not advance, 17th place)

Men's 200 m Individual Medley
 Tatsuya Kinugasa
 Heat — 2:03.32
 B-Final — 2:04.29 (→ 13th place)

 Takahiro Fujimoto
 Heat — 2:04.89
 Final — 2:07.74 (→ 15th place)

Men's 400 m Individual Medley
 Takahiro Fujimoto
 Heat — 4:20.07
 Final — 4:23.80 (→ 8th place)

 Toshiaki Kurasawa
 Heat — DSQ (→ did not advance, no ranking)

Men's 4 × 100 m Medley Relay
 Hajime Itoi, Akira Hayashi, Keiichi Kawanaka, and Tsutomu Nakano
 Heat — 3:43.88
 Final — 3:43.25 (→ 8th place)

Women's 50 m Freestyle
 Ayako Nakano
 Heat — 26.74 (→ did not advance, 20th place)

 Shina Matsudo
 Heat — 27.36 (→ did not advance, 34th place)

Women's 100 m Freestyle
 Suzu Chiba
 Heat — 56.26
 B-Final — 55.97 (→ 9th place)

 Ayako Nakano
 Heat — 57.71 (→ did not advance, 22nd place)

Women's 200 m Freestyle
 Suzu Chiba
 Heat — 2:00.96
 Final — 2:00.64 (→ 6th place)

 Yoko Koikawa
 Heat — 2:03.32 (→ did not advance, 17th place)

Women's 400 m Freestyle
 Suzu Chiba
 Heat — 4:13.85
 Final — 4:15.71 (→ 8th place)

Women's 100 m Backstroke
 Yoko Koikawa
 Heat — 1:02.83
 Final — 1:03.23 (→ 8th place)

 Noriko Inada
 Heat — 1:03.21
 B-Final — 1:03.42 (→ 12th place)

Women's 200 m Backstroke
 Junko Torikai
 Heat — 2:16.13
 B-Final — 2:15.20 (→ 11th place)

 Noriko Inada
 Heat — 2:15.74
 B-Final — 2:17.68 (→ 15th place)

Women's 100 m Breaststroke
 Kyoko Iwasaki
 Heat — 1:11.00
 B-Final — 1:11.16 (→ 13th place)

 Kyoko Kasuya
 Heat — 1:11.60 (→ did not advance, 17th place)

Women's 200 m Breaststroke
 Kyoko Iwasaki
 Heat — 2:27.78
 Final — 2:26.65 (→  Gold Medal)

 Kyoko Kasuya
 Heat — 2:32.55
 B-Final — 2:32.97 (→ 13th place)

Women's 100 m Butterfly
 Rie Shito
 Heat — 1:01.04
 Final — 1:01.16 (→ 8th place)

 Yoko Kando
 Heat — 1:01.56
 B-Final — 1:01.32 (→ 11th place)

Women's 200 m Butterfly
 Mika Haruna
 Heat — 2:11.21
 Final — 2:09.88 (→ 4th place)

 Rie Shito
 Heat — 2:11.00
 Final — 2:10.24 (→ 5th place)

Women's 200 m Individual Medley
 Hideko Hiranaka
 Heat — 2:18.13
 B-Final — 2:18.47 (→ 9th place)

 Eri Kimura
 Heat — 2:18.63
 B-Final — 2:18.91 (→ 12th place)

Women's 400 m Individual Medley
 Hideko Hiranaka
 Heat — 4:47.92
 Final — 4:46.24 (→ 5th place)

 Eri Kimura
 Heat — 4:46.17
 Final — 4:47.78 (→ 7th place)

Women's 4 × 100 m Freestyle Relay
 Ayako Nakano, Yoko Koikawa, Shina Matsudo, and Suzu Chiba
 Heat — 3:49.91 (→ did not advance, 10th place)

Women's 4 × 100 m Medley Relay
 Yoko Koikawa, Kyoko Iwasaki, Yoko Kando, and Suzu Chiba
 Heat — 4:11.48
 Final — 4:09.92 (→ 7th place)

Synchronized swimming

Three synchronized swimmers represented Japan in 1992.

Women's solo
 Fumiko Okuno
 Mikako Kotani
 Aki Takayama

Women's duet
 Fumiko Okuno
 Aki Takayama

Table tennis

Tennis

Men's Singles Competition
 Shuzo Matsuoka
 First round — Lost to Renzo Furlan (Italy) 4-6, 3-6, 6-3, 4-6

Women's double
 Maya Kidowaki and  Kimiko Date
 Third round —  lost to Jana Novotná and Andrea Strnadová  6–3, 7–6(4).

Volleyball

Men's Team Competition
Preliminary Round (Group A)
 Defeated United States (3-1)
 Lost to France (2-3)
 Lost to Italy (0-3)
 Lost to Spain (2-3)
 Defeated Canada (3-2)
Quarterfinals
 Lost to Brazil (0-3)
Classification Matches
5th/8th place: Defeated Unified Team (3-2)
5th/6th place: Lost to Italy (0-3) → Sixth place

Team Roster
Takashi Narita 
Katsumi Kawano 
Yuichi Nakagaichi 
Akihiko Matsuda 
Masafumi Oura 
Tatsuya Ueta 
Masaji Ogino 
Katsuyuki Minami 
Shigeru Aoyama 
Junichi Kuriuzawa 
Hideyuki Otake 
Masayuki Izumikawa

Women's Team Competition
Preliminary Round (Group A)
 Defeated United States (3-2)
 Defeated Spain (3-0)
 Lost to Unified Team (0-3)
Quarterfinals
 Lost to Brazil (1-3)
Classification Matches
5th/6th place: Defeated the Netherlands (3-1) → Fifth place

Team Roster
Ichiko Sato 
Kumi Nakada 
Michiyo Ishikake 
Chieko Nakanishi
Motoko Obayashi 
Yukiko Takahashi 
Ikuyo Namura 
Mika Yamauchi 
Asako Tajimi 
Tomoko Yoshihara 
Kiyoko Fukuda
Kazumi Nakamura

Weightlifting

Wrestling

References

Nations at the 1992 Summer Olympics
1992
Summer Olympics